Herrenchiemsee is a complex of royal buildings on Herreninsel, the largest island in the Chiemsee lake, in southern Bavaria, Germany.

The island, formerly the site of an Augustinian monastery, was purchased by King Ludwig II of Bavaria in 1873. The king had the premises converted into a residence, known as the Old Palace (Altes Schloss). From 1878 onwards, he had the New Herrenchiemsee Palace (Neues Schloss) erected, based on the model of Versailles. It was the largest, but also the last of his building projects, and remained incomplete. Today maintained by the Bavarian Administration of State-Owned Palaces, Gardens and Lakes, Herrenchiemsee is accessible to the public and a major tourist attraction.

Old Palace (Herrenchiemsee Abbey)
 
According to tradition, the Benedictine abbey of Herrenchiemsee was established about 765 AD by the Agilolfing duke Tassilo III of Bavaria at the northern tip of the Herreninsel. New findings however indicate an even earlier foundation between 620 and 629 by the Burgundian missionary Saint Eustace of Luxeuil, making it the oldest monastery in the Duchy of Bavaria, established some 70 years earlier than St Peter's Abbey in Salzburg.

In 969, Emperor Otto I consigned the abbey to the Archbishops of Salzburg. Initially a Benedictine monastery, Herrenchiemsee about 1130 was re-established as a convent of Canons regular living under the Rule of St. Augustine. The construction of a new Romanesque basilica, dedicated to Sts Sixtus and Sebastian, was completed in 1158.

In 1215, with the approval of Pope Innocent III, the Salzburg archbishop Eberhard von Regensburg made the monastery church the cathedral of a suffragan diocese in its own right, the Bishopric of Chiemsee, including several parishes on the mainland and in Tyrol. The Augustinian convent acted as cathedral chapter, while the auxiliary bishops retained their seat at the Chiemseehof palace in Salzburg. The Herrenchiemsee chapter was headed by provosts who from 1218 also held the position of an archdeacon. They even obtained pontifical vestments and the right of papal count palatines in the 15th century.

The present-day Baroque monastery complex was erected between 1642 and 1731. In the course of the German Mediatisation, Herrenchiemsee Abbey was secularised in 1803, the cathedral desecrated in 1807, and the Chiemsee diocese finally dissolved in 1808. The island was then sold; various owners demolished the cathedral, sold the interior, and even turned the abbey into a brewery. King Ludwig II of Bavaria warded off plans for the complete deforestation of the island by a Württemberg timber trade company by acquiring it in 1873. He had the leftover buildings converted for his private use, the complex that later became known as the "Old Palace", where he stayed surveying the construction of the New Herrenchiemsee Palace.

From 10 to 23 August 1948, the representatives of eleven German states of the Western Zones and West Berlin met at the Old Palace as the Verfassungskonvent (Constitutional Convention) to prepare the work for drafting the Basic Law (Grundgesetz) with a view to the founding of the Federal Republic of Germany.

New Palace

Construction

In 1867, the young king Ludwig II had traveled to France but had to return to Bavaria when he heard of the death of his uncle Otto, without the opportunity to visit the Palace of Versailles. He nevertheless was concerned with the residence of King Louis XIV and had plans for a similar retreat drafted by his court architect Georg von Dollmann (1830–1895). A possible building site was chosen in the Graswang valley near Ettal, the later site of Linderhof Palace.

After several revisions, Dollmann's designs for a former pavilion resembling Grand Trianon or the Château de Marly had grown to a large palace, including a copy of the Versailles Hall of Mirrors. Construction was halted by the outbreak of the Franco-Prussian War in 1870. In the following years, Ludwig concentrated on construction of Linderhof. He resumed his former plans after finally visiting Versailles in summer 1874, being received with honors by the French government on his birthday on August 25. Herrenchiemsee became the designated site for the large New Palace around a central corps de logis, designed by Dollmann, Christian Jank, and Franz von Seitz.

Construction started on 21 May 1878. Ludwig himself regularly supervised the building progress while he stayed at the Old Place nearby. Meant as a homage to the adored King Louis XIV and his divine right, Herrenchiemsee arose as a private, yet vast residence, which resembled Versailles but never was designed to host a thousand-headed royal household. Ludwig only had the opportunity to stay at the Palace for a few days in September 1885, with a handful of rooms richly decorated and the unfinished parts covered by colorful canvasses.

After the king's death in the following year, all construction work discontinued. During the period between 1863 and 1886, 16,579,674 Marks were spent. Using a 0.2304 troy ounce (7.171 g) 1890 '20 Mark' gold coin as a benchmark, this equates to 190,998 oz of gold, which at October 2013 prices was worth approximately £154,000,000 (US$250,100,000), more than the totalled construction cost of Linderhof and Neuschwanstein Castle together. The expenses brought the royal finances to the verge of bankruptcy, though they had a strong stimulus on the local economy.

Only a few weeks after Ludwig's death the building was opened for the public. In 1907 the unfinished North Wing was demolished, whilst the corresponding South Wing was never built. After the November Revolution, Crown Prince Rupprecht ceded Herrenchiemsee to the State of Bavaria in 1923.

Architecture

Unlike the medieval themed Neuschwanstein, begun in 1869, the Neo-Baroque New Palace stands as a monument to Ludwig's admiration of King Louis XIV of France. Its great Hall of Mirrors' ceiling is painted with 25 frescoes showing Louis XIV at his best.

The palace was shaped in a 'W' with wings flanking the central edifice. Only 16 of the 70 rooms were on the ground floor. Though it was to have been an equivalent to the Palace of Versailles, only the central portion was built before the king died and construction was discontinued with 50 of the 70 rooms still incomplete. It was never intended to be a perfectly exact replica of the French royal palace. Like Versailles, the Hall of Mirrors has 17 arches, the Hall of Peace and the Hall of War on either side have six windows each. The window niches at Herrenchiemsee are slightly wider than those at Versailles, making its central façade a few metres wider. The dining room features an elevator table and the world's largest Meissen porcelain chandelier. Technologically, the building also benefits from nearly two centuries of progress.  The original Versailles palace lacked toilets, water, and central heating, while the New Palace has all of these, including a large heated bathtub.

The palace had been built at a mostly inaccessible spot, in the middle of a forest, on a more or less remote lake island accessible by boat only – today via a system of small steamboats. This location, in defiance of both, an air of "enchantment" around it and the nearby chain of the Chiemgau Alps looming over and reflecting in the lake, may have been and may still be considered clearly less appealing than Neuschwanstein's more immediate, thus spectacularly impressive alpine backdrop near Füssen – not to speak of it having been perched right upon the blasted away tip of a steep rock and a quite intimidating gorge instead of a back yard. Not only the exterior, but also the interior at Herrenchiemsee were left even more unfinished than Neuschwanstein's. The latter's international popularisation, propelled by the inspiration Disney drew from it – say: "Cinderella Castle" – may only have added to the disproportional attention the two venues enjoy with tourists.

Also, seen from Munich, Linderhof is located in the same direction as and not very far away from Neuschwanstein, towards Tyrol and Swabia, so tourists often choose to visit both places within a day trip. Chiemsee with its islands lies on the way to Salzburg, i.e. almost in an opposite direction.

Gardens

The formal garden is filled with fountains, a copy of the Versailles Latona Fountain, and statues in both the classical style typical of the gardens of Versailles and the fantastic Romanticism favored by King Ludwig. Statues reminiscent of antiquity are found throughout the gardens, overwrought in the grand style of Richard Wagner's romantic operas.

Gallery

See also
 List of Baroque residences

References

External links

 Herrenchiemsee Page of Bavarian Palace Department (English): Bayerische Schlösserverwaltung | Schloss und Park Herrenchiemsee | Aktuelles 
 Herrenchiemsee Page of Bavarian Palace Department (German): Bayerische Schlösserverwaltung | Schloss und Park Herrenchiemsee | Aktuelles
 Herrenchiemsee, the bavarian Versailles: Herrenchiemsee, the bavarian Versailles

Museums in Bavaria
Palaces in Bavaria
Royal residences in Bavaria
Renaissance Revival architecture in Germany
Castles in Bavaria
Gardens in Bavaria
Historic house museums in Germany
Registered historic buildings and monuments in Bavaria
Buildings and structures in Rosenheim (district)
Ludwig II of Bavaria